Metamorphosis is the sixth studio album by the Danish melodic death metal band Mercenary. It features a radically diffent line-up than on previous releases. It is the first album since First Breath not to feature the Sandager brothers and the first without Mike Park on drums since 11 Dreams. It is Morten Løwe's debut on drums. 

Metamorphosis was first released on 25 February 2011 by Napalm Records. The US version was released on 29 March 2011 by  Prosthetic Records and included one bonus track. The song "The Follower" appeared on the band's YouTube channel on 23 December 2010. The song "In a River of Madness" was released for streaming on the band's Facebook page on 8 February 2011. The whole album was released for streaming on the Metal Hammer Germany website.

Track listing 
 "Through the Eyes of the Devil" - 5:13
 "The Follower" - 4:33
 "In a River of Madness" - 5:59
 "Memoria" - 5:43
 "Velvet Lies" - 6:53
 "In Bloodred Shades" - 4:35
 "Shades of Grey" - 5:36
 "On the Edge of Sanity" - 4:24
 "The Black Brigade" - 5:44

Bonus tracks 
 "Incorporate Your Demons" (US bonus track)
 "Vanity For Sale" (iTunes bonus track)
 "The Devil's Own" (iTunes bonus track)

Personnel 

Band members
René Pedersen – vocals, bass guitar
Martin Buus – lead guitar, keyboards
Jakob Mølbjerg – rhythm guitar
Morten Løwe – drums

Guests
 Kim Olesen - keyboards

Additional credits
Don G. – cover art

References 

2011 albums
Mercenary (band) albums